Jorge Fernando Pinheiro de Jesus  (born 24 July 1954) is a Portuguese professional football manager and former player, who is the current manager of Süper Lig club Fenerbahçe.

He started his career with Sporting CP, going on to play for 12 other clubs in 17 years as a professional, which included nine Primeira Liga seasons.

Jesus began a coaching career in 1990, and his first stop in the main category was with Felgueiras in the 1995–96 campaign. He went on to work with several teams, arriving at Benfica in 2009 and winning ten trophies (a club record for a single manager, winning all domestic trophies at least once) as well as reaching two UEFA Europa League finals with them in six seasons. He became manager of Flamengo in 2019 and won the Copa Libertadores and Campeonato Brasileiro Série A in his first year. He returned to Benfica in 2020 and did not win a single trophy despite a Portuguese record investment during the COVID-19 pandemic.

He was twice considered one of the 10 best club coaches in the world by the International Federation of Football History & Statistics, in 2013 (8th place) and in 2019 (7th place).

Playing career
Jesus, son of Virgolino António de Jesus who played for Sporting CP in the 1940s, was born in Amadora, Lisbon, and finished his football formation with the same club, making his top flight debut with S.C. Olhanense on loan from the Lions.

He played with Sporting's first team in the 1975–76 season, appearing in 12 matches and starting once as the Lisbon club finished in fifth place. Subsequently, released, he played in the country's top flight in seven of the following eight years, representing C.F. Os Belenenses, Grupo Desportivo Riopele, Juventude de Évora, União de Leiria, Vitória de Setúbal and S.C. Farense, amassing totals in the category of 166 games and 14 goals.

Jesus retired in 1990 at the age of 36, after spells in the second (mainly with his hometown C.F. Estrela da Amadora) and third levels.

Managerial career

Early years
After starting as a manager with lowly Amora FC, Jesus moved in December 1993 to F.C. Felgueiras as a replacement for Rodolfo Reis, helping the club promote to the top flight in his second season and being in and out of the team until January 1998, with Felgueiras back in division two.

Subsequently, he led former team Estrela da Amadora to two consecutive eighth-place finishes in the first division and, in quick succession, managed both Vitória de Setúbal and Amadora, celebrating top flight promotions with both even though he was fired by the latter in March 2003. In 2003–04 he helped Vitória de Guimarães narrowly avoid relegation, finishing two points ahead of first relegated team F.C. Alverca.

In the following four years, always in division one, Jesus was in charge of Moreirense FC (suffering relegation), União de Leiria and Belenenses, finishing fifth with the latter and qualifying to the UEFA Cup, and adding a presence in the 2007 Portuguese Cup final, losing 0–1 to Sporting.

On 20 May 2008, one day after leaving Belenenses, Jesus took over at S.C. Braga, leading the Minho side to the fifth position in the league and the round-of-16 in the UEFA Cup. Highlights in the latter competition included a 3–0 home win against Portsmouth and a last-minute 0–1 defeat to A.C. Milan at the San Siro. He won the last edition of the UEFA Intertoto Cup, something never achieved by other Portuguese club.

Benfica

2009–10: First season
On 17 June 2009, Jesus replaced Quique Flores at the helm of S.L. Benfica. In his first year he led Benfica to the first division title after a five-year wait, with only two league defeats and 78 goals scored, also reaching the quarter-finals in the Europa League, losing to Liverpool on a 3–5 aggregate score (this would be the last match Benfica would lose in a run that lasted 27 games); he quickly implemented a 4–1–3–2 formation which resulted in highly attractive football.

On 5 October 2009 Jesus achieved his 100th victory in the Portuguese League, in a 3–1 home win against F.C. Paços de Ferreira. The following month he experienced his first Derby de Lisboa, which ended in a 0–0 away draw; at the end of the victorious campaign, which also brought the domestic League Cup, the coach was rewarded with a new contract extension, running until 2013.

2010–2013: European improvement and domestic disappointment
After a 2–0 win at VfB Stuttgart in that season's Europa League (4–1 on aggregate), Benfica's first ever victory in Germany, Jesus surpassed the record held by Jimmy Hagan's 1972–73 team, with 16 consecutive wins. During the league campaign, which started without departed Ángel Di María and Ramires, the lack of rotation caused a major fatigue in the most used players. At the end of the season, Benfica only won the League Cup despite setting a domestic record of 18 consecutive wins in all competitions.

In the 2011–12 season, Jesus guided Benfica to the second place in the league. He led the team to a club's fourth League Cup, and to the knockout rounds of the 2011–12 Champions League, defeating FC Zenit Saint Petersburg first, before losing to Chelsea, in the quarter-finals.

On 10 December 2012, after a 3–1 away victory against Sporting, Jesus became the most successful Portuguese coach in the capital derby with seven wins in a total of nine, surpassing Toni (6/10). On 26 January of the following year he defeated former side Braga at the Estádio Municipal de Braga for the first time, after three defeats and one draw. He briefly led the league with a five-point advantage but did not maintain it, finishing in the second place again.

On 15 March 2013, in a match against FC Girondins de Bordeaux in the campaign's Europa League, Jesus reached the 200 game-milestone with Benfica, becoming the sixth coach in the club's history to do so. During the season he led the club to its first European final in 23 years: after coming third in its group in the UEFA Champions League, the side reached the final of the Europa League, losing 1–2 to Champions League winners Chelsea. Domestically, Benfica finished second in the league despite leading up to second to last day, and reached the final of the Portuguese Cup, their first since 2004–05, suffering an unexpected defeat at the hands of Guimarães; these losses added great pressure on the coach, as the club ended the season trophyless for the first time since 2007–08.

2013–2015: Six pieces of silverware
On 4 June 2013, Jesus renewed his contract for a further two seasons. When police attempted to clear Benfica supporters from the pitch at the end of a match at Guimarães in September, he became physically involved, taking the side of supporters while obstructing the police. The Portuguese Football Federation gave him a 30-day suspension, which meant he would miss four league matches, and fined him €5,355. On 11 February 2014, Jesus won his tenth game (2–0) against Sporting, which draw two and won only one as an opposing coach. On 20 March, he surpassed John Mortimore's 1985–86 record of 918 minutes without conceding a goal at home matches.

Jesus led Benfica to its 33rd title on 20 April 2014, and became the second Portuguese coach to win two national championships for the club after Toni. Four days earlier the team had beat FC Porto 3–1 in spite of being reduced to ten men with 1 hour left to play, thus reaching the final of the Portuguese Cup for the second consecutive time. On 28 April 2014, Jesus managed to put Benfica in another final, that of the domestic League Cup, eliminating Porto at the Dragão on penalties in spite of being reduced to ten men with 1 hour left to play again. The trophy was won at Leiria on 7 May against Rio Ave FC, securing his fourth in the competition and the club's fifth. On 1 May 2014, Jesus helped the club progress to its second consecutive Europa League final, by defeating Juventus 2–1 on aggregate after a goalless draw in Turin. The Portuguese lost on penalties 13 days later in the same city to Sevilla FC and he stated that referee Felix Brych overlooked three penalty decisions for Benfica. On 18 May 2014, after seeing out Rio Ave in the Portuguese Cup final, Jesus became the first Portuguese coach and the seventh overall to win the double for Benfica (the tenth in the club's history). He also became the first coach in Portugal to conquer the domestic treble in one season (the club's first ever).

On 10 August 2014, Jesus won his first Supertaça, as he surpassed János Biri as the coach with most matches at Benfica (273) and also tied with Cosme Damião in number of trophies won (8), surpassing both János Biri and Otto Glória. With that victory, he became the first coach to win Primeira Liga, Taça de Portugal, Supertaça Cândido de Oliveira and Taça da Liga (furthermore, in a year). He continued to break club records, becoming the coach with most victories (195) on 27 September 2014, in a win against Estoril. On 18 January 2015, Jesus reached the 300th game milestone at Benfica, with the highest winning percentage since Jimmy Hagan in the early 1970s, and on 26 April he surpassed Otto Glória as the coach with the most league matches at Benfica. On 17 May 2015, Jesus guided the club to its second consecutive league title, making it the first time Benfica won back-to-back league titles since 1984 (31 years), after Sven-Göran Eriksson, and became the first Portuguese coach to win two consecutive league titles at Benfica. On 29 May 2015, he won his fifth Taça da Liga (the club's sixth), and became the Benfica coach with most titles won (10) and the only to win 3 titles in two consecutive seasons. On 4 June 2015, Benfica announced they had concluded negotiations on a possible renewal of contract with Jesus, whose contract ended on 30 June.

Sporting CP
On 5 June 2015, Jesus signed a three-year contract with Benfica's Lisbon rivals Sporting CP, starting his functions on 1 July and earning €5 million per year. His first official match as Sporting coach was a Derby de Lisboa encounter with Benfica in the 2015 Supertaça, which Sporting won 1–0. Despite a positive start, he then failed to qualify for the UEFA Champions League and did not win any other trophy, finishing second in the Primeira Liga with 86 points (a club record), two points behind Benfica.

In May 2016, Jesus renewed his contract with Sporting and started earning €6 million a year until 2019. However, the 2016–17 season was trophyless.

In the following season, on 15 May 2018, Jesus, along with assistant coach Raul José and several players, was injured following an attack by around 50 supporters of Sporting at the club's training ground after the team finished third in the league and missed out on the UEFA Champions League qualification. Five days later, Sporting lost the Portuguese Cup final to Aves, making Jesus the first manager to have lost in the final with three clubs.

Al-Hilal
On 5 June 2018, Jesus left Portugal for the first time in his career and took charge of Saudi incumbent national champions Al-Hilal. In his first game on 17 August, he won the Saudi Super Cup with a 2–1 victory over Al-Ittihad in London. Although he had a record of sixteen wins and only one defeat in twenty matches, he was sacked by the chairman on 26 January 2019 following contractual disagreements.

Flamengo

On 1 June 2019, Jesus was appointed manager of Brazilian club Flamengo for a year. Upon signing, he was met with a negative reaction by fans, former Flamengo players and commentators, who believed that he was too old and could not adapt to Brazilian football; when the team beat opponents, their managers would credit the results to Flamengo's players and finances rather than to Jesus. He reacted to this atmosphere by saying "I did not come to take anybody's place or to teach anyone. I am neither better nor worse, I work according to a methodology. I would like to remind my Brazilian colleagues that we had a Brazilian [manager] in the national team, Scolari. He was admired by the Portuguese managers. He and many others who worked in Portugal...All of us in Portugal tried to learn from them, there was never this verbal aggression that there is against me. I don't understand these closed minds, even from some who are now at home, wearing gloves and shaking".

In his first game on 10 July, the team drew 1–1 at Athletico Paranaense in the first leg of the quarter-finals of the Copa do Brasil. Four days later in his first Campeonato Brasileiro Série A game, he beat Goiás 6–1 at the Maracanã Stadium.

Jesus' Flamengo won the 2019 Copa Libertadores, defeating Argentina's River Plate 2–1 with a late comeback in the final in Lima, Peru, on 23 November. He was the first foreign manager to win any international trophy with a Brazilian team, the fifth to win the Copa Libertadores with a foreign club, and the second European coach, as well as the second non-South American native, to accomplish the feat, after then-Yugoslav Mirko Jozić with Chile's Colo-Colo in 1991; he was also the fourth Portuguese to become club continental champion, following Artur Jorge, Manuel José, and José Mourinho. Within 24 hours of winning the continental title, Flamengo also won the national championship, when then second-placed Palmeiras lost 2–1 to Grêmio. He was the second foreign manager, and the first non-South American, to win the Brazilian championship after Argentine Carlos Volante in the debut edition in 1959, the first foreign manager to win it since the round-robin format was introduced, the first manager from his country to win a league title in South America, and the third Portuguese to win a national championship in the Americas, after Guilherme Farinha and Pedro Caixinha.

On 30 December 2019, President of Portugal Marcelo Rebelo de Sousa awarded to Jesus the Order of Prince Henry commander medal (ComIH). He said that Jesus' achievements aided Portugal's reputation abroad.

On 17 July 2020, Jesus left Flamengo. He won five trophies with the Brazilian club, winning 43 of the 57 games in charge of the Rubro-Negro.

Return to Benfica
Jesus returned to Benfica on 3 August 2020, signing a two-year contract with the club. Despite a €105 million investment, the biggest ever in Portuguese football, the season started with Benfica's elimination in the Champions League third qualifying round and continued with a loss at the Super Cup, an elimination from the League Cup, and a fourth place at the end of the league's first round. With his fourth loss at the Portuguese Cup final, Jesus equalled the record of José Maria Pedroto and Fernando Vaz.

After a rocky start to the 2021-22 campaign, which saw the 'águias' being beaten 1-0 by Portimonense SC and 3-1 by Sporting CP in the league - both at home -, and suffer a 3-0 defeat at FC Porto's home ground in the Portuguese Cup round of 16, Jorge Jesus left Benfica by mutual consent on 28 December 2021, just two days shy of another trip to the Dragão. He was replaced by then Benfica B coach, Nélson Veríssimo.

Fenerbahçe
Jesus arrived at Istanbul on May 31, 2022, and toured the stadium on June 1, 2022. On June 2, Jesus was appointed as the manager of Fenerbahçe on a one-year deal.

Personal life
Jesus married his second wife, Ivone, and the couple had a son, Mauro. From his previous marriage, he had a daughter Tânia and a son Gonçalo.

He had over €1 million invested in the Banco Privado Português (BPP) when it went bankrupt in 2009. He recovered eighty percent of that amount in March 2014.

In March 2020, Jesus tested positive for COVID-19 virus during the COVID-19 pandemic. He had previously requested that Brazilian football shut down due to the virus.

Managerial statistics

Honours

Managerial
Braga
 UEFA Intertoto Cup: 2008

Benfica
 Primeira Liga: 2009–10, 2013–14, 2014–15
 Taça de Portugal: 2013–14
 Taça da Liga: 2009–10, 2010–11, 2011–12, 2013–14, 2014–15
 Supertaça Cândido de Oliveira: 2014
 UEFA Europa League runner-up: 2012–13, 2013–14

Sporting CP
 Taça da Liga: 2017–18
 Supertaça Cândido de Oliveira: 2015

Al Hilal
 Saudi Super Cup: 2018

Flamengo
 Campeonato Brasileiro Série A: 2019
 Copa Libertadores: 2019
 Supercopa do Brasil: 2020
 Recopa Sudamericana: 2020
 Campeonato Carioca: 2020
 FIFA Club World Cup runner-up: 2019

Individual
 Primeira Liga's Best Coach: 2009–10, 2013–14, 2014–15
 Saudi Professional League Manager of the Month: September 2018
 IFFHS World's Best Club Coach: 8th in 2013, 7th in 2019
 Cosme Damião Awards – Coach of the Year: 2014
Globos de Ouro Best Portuguese Manager: 2015, 2016
 Bola de Prata Best Coach: 2019
 Prêmio Craque do Brasileirão Best Coach: 2019

Orders
 Knight Commander of the Order of Prince Henry (30 December 2019)

References

External links

 
 
 

1954 births
Living people
People from Amadora
Portuguese footballers
Association football midfielders
Sporting CP footballers
S.C. Olhanense players
C.F. Os Belenenses players
G.D. Riopele players
Juventude Sport Clube players
U.D. Leiria players
Vitória F.C. players
S.C. Farense players
G.D. Peniche players
C.F. Estrela da Amadora players
Sport Benfica e Castelo Branco players
S.R. Almancilense players
Primeira Liga players
Liga Portugal 2 players
Portuguese football managers
C.F. Estrela da Amadora managers
Vitória F.C. managers
Vitória S.C. managers
Moreirense F.C. managers
U.D. Leiria managers
C.F. Os Belenenses managers
S.C. Braga managers
S.L. Benfica managers
Sporting CP managers
Al Hilal SFC managers
Fenerbahçe football managers
CR Flamengo managers
Primeira Liga managers
Saudi Professional League managers
Campeonato Brasileiro Série A managers
Portuguese expatriate football managers
Süper Lig managers
Portuguese expatriate sportspeople in Saudi Arabia
Portuguese expatriate sportspeople in Brazil
Portuguese expatriate sportspeople in Turkey
Expatriate football managers in Saudi Arabia
Expatriate football managers in Brazil
Expatriate football managers in Turkey
Commanders of the Order of Prince Henry
Sportspeople from Lisbon District
Portuguese people of Brazilian descent